
The Commune of Scopello (Italian: Comune di Scopello; population about 450) is located in the Valsesia region of the Italian Pennine Alps, in the Piedmontese Province of Vercelli.

Other centres include Casa Pareti, Chioso, Frasso, Villabella, and Alpe di Mera., The last of these, as the name ‘Alpe’ suggests, once provided summer pasture for livestock. Today it is a winter ski resort.

Local government
Scopello belongs to the Comunità Montana Valsesia, a union of various communes in the Valsesia. The mayor is Paolo Ferraris, who stood on a local slate (lista civica), and was elected on 28 May 2006.

Neighbouring communes
Scopello borders Boccioleto, Campertogno, Caprile, Crevacuore, Guardabosone, Pettinengo, Pila, Piode, Scopa, Trivero, and Valle San Nicolao.

Population trends

Sources
.
.
.
.

References

External links
 www.scopello.com, official site of the commune.
 chiosovalsesia, a site on one of Scopello's local centres which includes historical photographs.
 Alpe di Mera, official site of the Proloco.

Cities and towns in Piedmont
Ski areas and resorts in Italy